The 3rd FINA World Junior Swimming Championships, were held on August 16–21, 2011, in Lima, Peru.

Medal table

Medal summary

Boys' events

Girls' events

External links
Official site
 Results

S
J
J
S
Sports competitions in Lima
FINA World Junior Swimming Championships